Gamma Lyrae, Latinised from γ Lyrae, and formally named Sulafat , is the second-brightest star in the northern constellation of Lyra. With an apparent visual magnitude of 3.3, it is readily visible to the naked eye. At that distance, the visual magnitude of the star is diminished by an extinction factor of  due to interstellar dust.

Nomenclature
γ Lyrae (Latinised to Gamma Lyrae) is the star's Bayer designation.

It bore the traditional names Sulafat (Sulaphat), from the Arabic  al-sulḥafāt "turtle", and Jugum, from the Latin  "yoke". The connection with turtles is that fine harps were traditionally made of tortoiseshell. In 2016, the International Astronomical Union organized a Working Group on Star Names (WGSN) to catalogue and standardize proper names for stars. The WGSN approved the name Sulafat for this star on 21 August 2016 and it is now so entered in the IAU Catalog of Star Names.

Properties
This is a giant star with a stellar classification of B9 III, indicating it has exhausted the supply of hydrogen at its core and evolved away from the main sequence.

In 1909, Canadian astronomer Samuel A. Mitchell identified this star as a spectroscopic binary, although he was unable to split the absorption lines of the components. He found that a period of 25.6 days matched his measurements. It was reported as a spectroscopic binary as recently as 2001, but is now believed to be a single star with a high rate of rotation for stars of this type.

References

External links

B-type giants
Lyra (constellation)
Lyrae, Gamma
Durchmusterung objects
Lyrae, 14
176437
093194
7178
Sulafat